Cleodoxus carinatus is a species of longhorn beetles of the subfamily Lamiinae. It was described by White in 1855, and is known from Colombia, eastern Ecuador, northern Argentina,  and Bolivia.

References

Beetles described in 1855
Acanthocinini